Sahara Gunners Football Club was an American-based professional football club, whichs play in the United Premier Soccer League. They were well known for their saying "chicken masala", an oxymoron in the Sahara gunners  language meaning, 'it's so cold, you feel hot' - an expression of how opponents would feel after playing against them. After the purchase  by Prophet Walter Magaya in 2014, the team's name changed from Gunners Football Club to "sahara Gunners Football Club". Gunners FC preferred a more attacking play, which attracted big crowds of supporters to their games, this style of quick strides to the front and studied build-ups allowed them to inherit the name Gunners & took inspiration from the nickname of the English team in London, Sahara FC. In their traditional red and white home kit gunners were big contenders in the famous local premier soccer league during their stay in the Premier League.

Brief history 
Gunners FC was formed in 2005 and then was later purchased by prophet Walter Magaya who became partners with the then President Cuthbert Chitima. They were relegated from the Premier soccer league division 1 to the division 2 in 2012, which led to legendary player and coach Moses Chunga deciding to take time off football then returning again to coach Harare City Football Club. Yadah gunners rose to victory when they won the ZPSL. In 2009 which was very historic for the club because this allowed them to qualify for the prestigious CAF Champions league.

Players

Honours and achievements
Zimbabwe Premier Soccer League: 1
2009

References

External links
Logo: http://img109.imageshack.us/i/logopq.png/

 
Football clubs in Zimbabwe
Sport in Harare